Anara Tower was a proposed supertall skyscraper in Dubai. It was slated to be one of Dubai's tallest buildings, and would have been 600 m (1,968 ft) tall with 135 floors. It was designed to look like a massive wind turbine. It was supposed to be a mixed use tower with offices, retail spaces, apartments, and an art gallery. Anara Tower would have incorporated sky gardens every 27 floors and would have contained a luxury restaurant. If built it was expected to be an energy efficient tower by installing renewable sources of energy and incorporating water efficiency strategies.

See also
List of tallest buildings in Dubai

References

External links
Official Website

Proposed skyscrapers in Dubai
Unbuilt buildings and structures in Dubai